The Deer Moat or Stag Moat is a natural ravine dividing the promontory of Prague Castle and its north foreground. It got its name because it served as a breeding ground for deer between the 17th and 18th centuries. Since 2002, the two parts are connected by a tunnel for pedestrians designed by a Czech architect Josef Pleskot. In the spring of 2021 the upper part of the Deer Moat was reopened to public after a reconstruction that took place in the previous years, however the lower part still remains closed.

References 

Prague Castle
Geography of Prague